Juan Carlos Aparicio Pérez (born 20 April 1955) is a Spanish politician and chemist. He served as Minister of Labour and Social of Spain from February 2000 to July 2002.

References

1955 births
Living people
University of Valladolid alumni
Government ministers of Spain
21st-century Spanish politicians
Labour ministers of Spain